Łętownia-Gościniec is a village in the administrative district of Gmina Nowa Sarzyna, within Leżajsk County, Podkarpackie Voivodeship, in south-eastern Poland.

The village has a population of 592.

References

Villages in Leżajsk County